Ledesmodina is a genus of leaf beetles in the subfamily Eumolpinae. It is found in Central America and South America.

Species
 Ledesmodina auricollis (Lefèvre, 1877)
 Ledesmodina erosula (Lefèvre, 1891)
 Ledesmodina erosula abdominalis (Jacoby, 1900)
 Ledesmodina erosula aenea (Jacoby, 1899)
 Ledesmodina erosula erosula (Lefèvre, 1891)
 Ledesmodina erosula minutella Bechyné, 1955
 Ledesmodina megachroma Bechyné & Bechyné, 1976
 Ledesmodina monrosi Bechyné, 1951

References

Chrysomelidae genera
Eumolpinae
Beetles of Central America
Beetles of South America